Bash Bolagh, also rendered as Bash-Bulag, may refer to:
 Bash Bolagh, East Azerbaijan
 Bash Bolagh, West Azerbaijan

See also
 Dash Bolagh (disambiguation)